Marguerite Broquedis defeated Mieken Rieckin the final, 6–3, 0–6, 6–4 to win the inaugural women's singles tennis title at the World Hard Court Championships.

Draw

Draw

References

Women's Singles
World Hard Court Championships